Michael Gandolfini (born May 10, 1999) is an American actor. Gandolfini made his film debut in Ocean's 8 (2018) and appeared in The Many Saints of Newark (2021), in which he played the role of Tony Soprano, which was originally portrayed by his late father James Gandolfini in the television series The Sopranos.

Early life 
Gandolfini was born on May 10, 1999, in New York City to actor James Gandolfini and Marcy Wudarski. He is of Italian, Polish, and Slovak heritage, and has a younger half-sister from his father's second marriage. While he was a teenager Gandolfini enjoyed performing, but his father advised against an acting career instead wanting him to pursue sports or "be a director. They have the power," he said.

James Gandolfini died unexpectedly at the age of 51 of a heart attack in Rome on June 19, 2013.

Career 

After his father's death Michael Gandolfini decided to pursue acting. He enrolled at New York University after graduating from high school. After early auditions, he was cast in the HBO drama series The Deuce as Joey Dwyer. In 2019, he was cast in The Many Saints of Newark to play the young version of Tony Soprano, the role played by his father in the television series The Sopranos. Gandolfini had never watched the show. He described watching it while preparing for the role as an intense process. He was later cast in the Russo brothers' crime drama Cherry.

Filmography

Film

Television

References

External links
 

1999 births
Living people
21st-century American male actors
American male child actors
American male models
American male film actors
American male television actors
American people of Italian descent
American people of Polish descent
Male actors from New York City
New York University alumni